Signature is the second independent and eighth studio album by R&B singer Joe, which was released on July 14, 2009. His previous album, Joe Thomas, New Man, features cuts from this album. The album features ballads written, produced, and arranged by Joe.
The lead single is "Majic", which has peaked at #57 on Billboard's Hot R&B/Hip-Hop Songs chart. The album debuted #7 on the Billboard 200, #2 on the Top R&B/Hip-Hop Albums chart and #1 on the Independent Albums chart. The deluxe edition of the album includes remixes to "We Need to Roll" and "Man in Your Life", the former featuring Mario & Trey Songz and the latter featuring The Game.

Track listing

Personnel

 Drums: Nat Townsley, Jermaine Parrish, Obed Calvaire, Abe Fogel, Benjamin Lawton
 Programming: Joe Thomas
 Percussion: Victor Jones
 Keyboards: Joe Thomas, John DiMartino, Mike Gallagher
 Fender Rhodes: Bobby Douglas
 Bass: Marshall Knights, LeShawn Thomas, Richard Bona, John Benitez
 Guitar: Mark Bowers, Joshua Paul Thompson, Dylan Jones
 Alto Saxophone: Lawrence Felman
 Tenor Saxophone: Atta Brecker, Ferrer White

 Flute: David Conley 
 Trumpet: Randy Brecker, Richard Bougler
 Recording engineer: Elijah Griffin, John Roper, Gene Lennon
 Mixing: Jean-Marie Horvat, Tom Soares
 Mastering: Dave Kutch
 Executive producer: Kedar Massenburg, Joe Thomas 
 Photography: Robert Munore, Eduardo Whittington
 Art direction: Kedar Massenburg, Kierstan Tucker-McCollough
 Design: Eduardo Whittington

Charts

Weekly charts

Year-end charts

References

2009 albums
Joe (singer) albums